Peter Dinwiddie Wigginton (September 6, 1839 – July 7, 1890) was an American lawyer and politician who served as a U.S. representative from California during the 1870s.

Biography 
Born in Springfield, Illinois, Wigginton moved to Wisconsin with his parents in 1843.
He completed preparatory studies and attended the University of Wisconsin–Madison.
He studied law.
He was admitted to the bar in 1859 and practiced.
He was editor of the Dodgeville (Wisconsin) Advocate.
He moved to Snelling, California, in 1862, and continued the practice of law.
He served as district attorney of Merced County 1864–1868.

Congress 
Wigginton was elected as a Democrat to the Forty-fourth Congress (March 4, 1875 – March 3, 1877).
He successfully contested the election of Romualdo Pacheco to the Forty-fifth Congress (February 7, 1878 – March 4, 1879).
He settled in San Francisco in 1880 and resumed the practice of law. In 1886, Wigginton founded the American Party, a nativist third party. He would go on to be nominated by the party as its candidate for Vice President in the 1888 in place of James R. Geer.

Death
He died in Oakland, California, July 7, 1890.
He was interred in Mountain View Cemetery.

References

External links 
 

1839 births
1890 deaths
University of Wisconsin–Madison alumni
Democratic Party members of the United States House of Representatives from California
California Know Nothings
1888 United States vice-presidential candidates
19th-century American politicians